is the 16th single by Japanese idol duo Wink. Written by Neko Oikawa and Osny S. Melo, the single was released on October 21, 1992, by Polystar Records.

Background and release 
The B-side, "Mujitsu no Object" is a Japanese-language cover of Pat Benatar's "Invincible".

"Real na Yume no Jōken" peaked at No. 10 on the Oricon's weekly charts and sold over 90,000 copies.

Track listing

Chart positions 
Weekly charts

Year-end charts

References

External links 
 
 

1992 singles
1992 songs
Wink (duo) songs
Japanese-language songs
Songs with lyrics by Neko Oikawa